Handloom saris are a traditional textile art of Bangladesh and India. The production of handloom saris are important for economic development in rural India.

Completion of a single sari takes two to three days of work.  Several regions have their own traditions of handloom saris. The most traditional are made in West Bengal.

The weaving process 

A handloom sari is often woven on a shuttle-pit loom made from ropes, wooden beams and poles. The shuttle is thrown from side-to-side by the weaver. Other weavers use a fly-shuttle loom which can produce different types of patterns. The saris can vary in size and quality.

Handloom sari weaving is generally a family enterprise and one of India's cottage industries. The handloom saris are made from silk or cotton threads. The handloom weaving process requires several stages in order to produce the final product. Traditionally the processes of dyeing (during the yarn, fabric, or garment stage), warping, sizing, attaching the warp, weft winding and weaving were done by weavers and local specialists around weaving villages. However, currently most of the activities are outsourced.

Major regional weaving traditions
Weaving takes place in many regions of India. Each region has tradition designs for the motifs, design and colours. Handloom weaving takes place in villages supporting lakhs of families for their livelihood.

Types of handloom saris
Some of the well-known Indian handloom saris are Kanchipuram silk saris, Maheshwari sari, Bagh print sari, Chanderi silk saris,  Tussar silk sari, Banarasi silk sari, Baluchuri saris, Sambalpuri saris, Kantha stitch saris, Bhadhini saris and Munga saris. Some handloom saris are made out of high-quality silk fabric which is valued for its luster.

Baluchari saris
The designs on Baluchuri saris feature mythology stories which can be seen in the temples of Bishnupur & Bankura of West Bengal. The pallus and borders showcase elaborate designs of flowers, animals and royal court scenes. Some feature designs of Ramayana and Mahabharata scenes narrating the stories. The most popular colours of Balachuri saris are green, red, white and yellow.  A master weaver usually takes 20–25 days to complete weaving of a Baluchuri sari.

Kanchipuram saris
The quality of zari used in weaving kanchipuram saris in Tamil Nadu is superior and attracts foreign visitors. The zaris used are generally gold and silver.

Tussar saris
Tussar sari are soft to touch and are woven in areas of Chhattisgarh, Jharkhand and Bhalgalpur. The bright colour combinations and the breathable nature of the fabric make it unique.

Banarasi saris
Banarasi saris  have been a valuable possession for brides. Woven by master craftsmanship of Uttar Pradesh, they feature intricately woven designs with golden and silver threads. These saris are usually heavy and can be worn in festivals as well as at weddings.

Impact on the economy and weavers' cooperatives
The handloom sector plays a vital role in the country's economy and as a result evens the government are implementing several measures to optimize all the resources available. The handloom sector is the second largest economic activity after agriculture which involves nearly 30 lakh weavers. It contributes nearly 22% of cloth produced in the country. The handloom industry belongs to the pre-independence period and the new economic policy in India is implemented to thrust this industry. The Textile Policy 1985 emphasised the promotion of handloom. According to the Handloom Census of 2009–2010, this sector provides employment to 4.33 million people.

In the 2010 census, 4.4 million families were engaged in hand weaving. In December 2011, the handloom industry wove 6.9 billion square metres of cloth. Andhra Pradesh is said to be the home of 359,212 weaver families who work in primary cooperative handloom societies. Primary Handloom Weavers Cooperatives (PHWCS) includes weavers within certain specific geographical limits and provides production work to the members. The cooperatives also see that the weavers receive fare wages and conduct various welfare measures.

See also
Documentary Film on Handloom Weavers of Varanasi
Khadi
 Khādī Development and Village Industries Commission (Khadi Gramodyog)

References

External links
 Central Silk Board 

Textile arts of India
Handloom sarees
Textile arts of Bangladesh